CSM Galați is an amateur Romanian rugby union club founded in 2018. As of 2022, it is the youngest club playing in the top-tier Romanian Liga Națională de Rugby.

Current squad
In the 2022 edition of the Liga Națională de Rugby, the current squad is as follows:

References

External links
Liga Nationala Rugby link

Romanian rugby union teams